Tywanna Smith (born August 17, 1982), née Tywanna Inmon, is a professional sports manager, author and former professional basketball player. She is the author of Surviving the Lights: A Professional Athlete's Playbook to Avoiding the Curse.

Playing career

Ole Miss, 2000–2004 
Tywanna Smith played college basketball for Ole Miss as a starter for four years. She was selected to be captain of the team in the 2003–04 season, her senior year. At the postseason team banquet, she was presented with award for the highest grade point average. Her academic achievements earned her a spot on the 2003 SEC Winter Academic Honor Roll.

On March 4, 2004, in an SEC Tournament game against Alabama, she pulled down 13 rebounds, which is tied for the third best number of rebounds in an SEC Tournament game.

Mississippi statistics
Source

Professional 
From her college career at the University of Mississippi, Smith moved overseas to play basketball professionally in Europe. She played for the Dutch team Amazone from 2005 to 2006 and the Spanish team Pabellon-Ourense from 2006 to 2007. Smith also made the Dutch FEB All-Star Gala in 2006.

After basketball 
Smith gives advice to sports players regarding finances, branding, and business. In 2016, she launched The Athlete's Nexus, a sports marketing and business management business for international professional athletes, including those in the NBA and NFL.

References

External links
 Ole Miss player profile

1982 births
Living people
American expatriate basketball people in the Netherlands
American expatriate basketball people in Spain
American women's basketball players
Basketball players from Arkansas
Ole Miss Rebels women's basketball players
People from West Memphis, Arkansas
American writers
Sports managers
Forwards (basketball)